Charisse Mills is a Trinidadian pop opera singer and songwriter. She is best known for her collaborations with artists Ne-Yo and French Montana, and for her vocal combinations of pop and opera, termed "pop'era".

Early life

Mills was born in Trinidad and Tobago before she moved to Queens, New York, with her mother Charmaine Mills.

Career

In an interview with Vocab Magazine, Mills said her interest in opera music began in the eleventh grade. She won accolades performing through the New York State School Music Association. In 2011, Mills performed live at the 2011 NV Awards.

In 2015, R&B artist Ne-Yo featured Mills on “Integrity” on his“Non-Fiction.” Ne-Yo described her as contributing a “beautiful operatic melody” to the song “Integrity” that resulted from a freestyle session with her while recording. Mills’ first single, “Champagne”, was written by her, French Montana, Warren Zavala and Brandon Howard and features hip-hop artist French Montana.

XXL Magazine reported that Mills created her own genre of music with the combination of pop music and opera, called “pop’era.” In an interview with Soul Dynamic, Mills said she infused pop and opera to form “pop’era.” Mills has performed opera and R&B at Lincoln Center, in Times Square, and performed for Jesse Jackson's seventieth birthday at Rainbow/PUSH. Mills, along with Charmaine Mills, is the cofounder of C. Moi apparel. C. Moi sponsored the Princess Project, providing custom-made prom dresses to underprivileged youth. wow starting her acting career in 2019 she landed a very popular workout television show called pump currently she is filming a movie called entanglement where she is a great supporting actress currently working on a television show that cannot be announced just yet while shooting a Verizon commercial.

Personal life

Mills is resident of Los Angeles, California.

References

American opera singers
Rappers from Los Angeles
1988 births
Living people
21st-century American rappers
Classical musicians from California